As of the 2022 Open Championship, 230 golfers have won one of men's professional golf's four professional major championships – the modern accepted definition of the majors has only existed since the 1960s but wins in these tournaments have been retrospectively recognized by all the major sanctioning organizations.

By year 

For details of the flag icons, see: List of National Flags

By player 

Players are listed here in order of their first win.

For much of the modern era the four major championships have been played chronologically in the order listed, but this has not always been the case, and starting in 2019 the PGA Championship was rescheduled as the second major of the year.

See also
List of men's major championships winning golfers
Chronological list of LPGA major golf champions

Notes

References

Majors
Chronological list
 
Majors, men's chronological

sv:Lista över golfens majorsegrare